is a Japanese dish particularly in Akita Prefecture. Freshly cooked rice is pounded until somewhat mashed, then formed into cylinders around Japanese cedar skewers, and toasted over an open hearth. It can then be served with sweet miso or cooked as dumplings with meat and vegetables in soups.

See also
Chikuwa
 List of Japanese soups and stews

Notes 

Culture in Akita Prefecture
Japanese soups and stews